The Sikh conquest of the Punjab was fought from 1810 to 1820, between the Sikh Empire and Afghanistan. The Sikh Empire, led by Ranjit Singh, took control of the entirety of Punjab from the Afghans as well as local princes. The victory was in part due to the Sikhs being trained by French and Italian officers.

Background 

Wars involving Afghanistan